Sapallan Warmi (Quechua sapalla only, unique, -n a suffix, warmi woman, also spelled Sapallanhuarmi) is a mountain in the Cordillera Central in the Andes of Peru which reaches a height of approximately . It is located in the Lima Region, Yauyos Province, Alis District.

References 

Mountains of Peru
Mountains of Lima Region